A gay skinhead, also known as a gayskin or queerskin, is a gay person who identifies with the skinhead subculture. Some gay skinheads have a sexual fetish for skinhead clothing styles. 

Gay skinheads figure in the work of gay artists such as Canadian painter Attila Richard Lukacs and filmmaker Bruce LaBruce. Gay skinheads have been featured on the catwalks of fashion designers Alexander McQueen and Jean-Paul Gaultier since the early 1990s.

Not all skinheads who are gay fetishize the skinhead image. These individuals may prefer not to be referred to as gayskins because of the sexual connotations—and they may not associate with self-identified gayskins for the same reason, but to traditional skinhead culture.

There exists a vibrant, gay skinhead social scene, both online and at events, particularly in parts of Europe and the United Kingdom.

References

Bibliography

Further reading
 ""Oi! Skins": Trans-Atlantic Gay Skinhead Discourse on the Internet" by James Haines, Intercultural Communication (1999)
 "An Analysis of Skinhead Websites and Social Networks, A Decade Later" by Robin Maria Valeri, Nicole E. Sweazy and Kevin Borgeson, Michigan Sociological Review (2017)
 "Nicky Crane: The secret double life of a gay neo-Nazi" by Jon Kelly, BBC News Magazine (Dec 6, 2013)

See also
Nicky Crane
Queercore
SHARP

External links

 Non-Fetish Queer Skinheads - internets oldest place for gay skinheads (on various platforms since 1998)
 "Queer Skinheads Against Racial Prejudice " Network of Lesbian, Gay, Bisexual, Trans & Queer Skinheads and friends worldwide.

Gay masculinity
Gay culture
Skinhead